Bird station is a flag stop railway station in Bird, Manitoba, Canada.  The stop is served by Via Rail's Winnipeg – Churchill train. It is located on the Fox Lake Cree Nation Indian reserve in northeastern Manitoba.

Footnotes

External links 
Station Information, Viarail.ca

Via Rail stations in Manitoba